The 2009 Minneapolis City Council elections were held on November 3, 2009 to elect the 13 members of the Minneapolis City Council for four-year terms. Candidates affiliated with the Minnesota Democratic–Farmer–Labor Party (DFL) won 12 seats and the Green Party of Minnesota one seat.

Members were elected from single-member districts via instant-runoff voting, popularly known as ranked choice voting. Voters had the option of ranking up to three candidates. Municipal elections in Minnesota are nonpartisan, although candidates were able to identify with a political party on the ballot.

Political party endorsements

Results

Summary

Ward 1

Ward 2

Ward 3

Ward 4

Ward 5

Ward 6

Ward 7

Ward 8

Ward 9

Ward 10

Ward 11

Ward 12

Ward 13

See also
 Minneapolis municipal elections, 2009

References

Minneapolis City Council
2009 Minnesota elections
Local elections in Minnesota
Minneapolis City Council 2009